Bahaabad may refer to:
 Bahaabad, Razavi Khorasan
 Bahaabad, Semnan